Orders, decorations, and medals of Turkey are civil and military state decorations regulated and bestowed by the Turkish Republic.

Civil decorations 
Civil decorations were established on October 24, 1983, with the Law on Medals and Orders, Act No. 2933. They are rewarded to Turkish citizens, foreigners and organizations for distinguished service, honor and pride in contribution to the emerge of Turkish State through generous action, self-sacrifice, achievement or merit at home or abroad.

Medals

Orders

Military decorations

Medals

Orders

Former decorations
Medal of Independence (İstiklal Madalyası)

References

External links